Arthur Masters is a former association football player who represented New Zealand at international level.

Masters made a solitary official international appearance for New Zealand in a 1–8 loss to Australia on 11 September 1948, Masters scoring New Zealand's goal that day.

References 

Year of birth missing (living people)
Living people
New Zealand association footballers
New Zealand international footballers
Association footballers not categorized by position